Kahilipara is a locality in Guwahati, Assam, India. The nearest airport is at Guwahati Airport and railway station at Paltan Bazaar. Surrounded by localities of Ganeshguri and Lalganesh, it is a residential area. Most educational department offices of state government are located here. Some of the important offices are
 Directorate of Public Instruction (the educational department from primary school to higher education)
 State Council for Technical Education
 Special Branch Assam Police
 Government BDS Deaf and Dumb School
 Axom Sarba Sikha Abhiyan Mission Office
 State Forensic Laboratory
 Jyoti Chitraban film studio
 10th Assam Police Battalion
 4th Assam Police battalion
 133KV grid sub station AGCL
 National Power Training Institute

See also
 Bhetapara
 Chandmari

References

Neighbourhoods in Guwahati